Taishan District is a district home to 77,169 people in New Taipei, Taiwan.

History 
Taishan was formally a rural township. On December 25, 2010, after Taipei County was upgraded to New Taipei City, Taishan Township was upgraded to Taishan District.

Geography 
Area: 19.16 km2
Population: 77,169 people (February 2023)
Taishan borders Wugu, Linkou, and Xinzhuang districts of New Taipei City, as well as Guishan District of Taoyuan City.

Infrastructures
 Fu Jen Catholic University Hospital

Government agencies
 Freeway Bureau

Education

Higher education
 Lee-Ming Institute of Technology
 Ming Chi University of Technology

High school
 New Taipei Municipal Taishan Senior High School (新北市立泰山高級中學)

Junior high school
 New Taipei Municipal Taishan Junior High School (新北市立泰山國民中學) 
 New Taipei Municipal Yi Shiue Junior High School (新北市立義學國民中學)

Elementary school
 New Taipei Municipal Taishan Elementary School (新北市立泰山國民小學) 
 New Taipei Municipal Ming-Zhi Elementary School (新北市立明志國民小學) 
 New Taipei Municipal Tong-Zong Elementary School 
 New Taipei Municipal Yi Shiue Elementary School

Library
 New Taipei City Library Taishan Guizi Branch
 New Taipei City Library Taishan Branch
 New Taipei City Library Taishan Parent-Child Reading Room

Tourist attractions

 Mingzhi Academy
 Cultural and Historical Image Park
 Ci Xiu Park
 Taishan Doll Museum
 Upper Taishan Temple
 Yihuekeng Natural Ecological Park
 Fu-Da Night Market (Near the backdoor of Fu Jen Catholic University)

Transportation

 Taishan is served by the National Highway No. 1.

Taipei Metro
 Danfeng Station

Taoyuan Airport MRT
 Taishan metro station
 Taishan Guihe metro station

Notable natives
 Lee Hong-yuan, Minister of the Interior (2012-2014)

See also
 New Taipei City

References

External links

  

Districts of New Taipei